Kennedy House International School is a private, International Primary School founded in 2009. It's 20 acre rural campus is situated in Usa River, on the outskirts of Arusha, in Tanzania. It was established out of the need for a quality international pre and primary school in the Usa River area. Kennedy House School is accredited by the Cambridge International Curriculum and follows the British National Curriculum. The school's teaching staff are University Qualified International Teachers. Typically, pupils progress from Kennedy House to senior schools in Tanzania, the UK, mainland Europe, South Africa and Australia.

Facilities 
The school has dedicated Science, Music and Art rooms, playing fields for football, rugby, cricket and athletics, in addition to netball and tennis courts and a 25-metre swimming pool in which Kennedy House School hosts competitive swimming galas against other International Schools in Northern Tanzania.

Location 
The school is located in Usa River, between the cities of Arusha and Moshi, in Northern Tanzania. It is situated 24 kilometers from Kilimanjaro International Airport. It runs a daily door-to-door bus service for pupils living in Arusha.

References

Buildings and structures in Arusha
Primary schools in Tanzania
International schools in Tanzania
Educational institutions established in 2009
2009 establishments in Tanzania